Cotylea may refer to:
 Cotylea (worm), a sub-order of free-living marine turbellarian flatworms in the order Polycladida
 Saxifraga sect. Cotylea, a section in the plant genus Saxifraga